Found in Far Away Places is the seventh studio album by American metalcore band August Burns Red. It was released on June 29, 2015, through Fearless Records and was produced by Carson Slovak and Grant McFarland. It is their first release on the label. On December 7, 2015, the single "Identity" was nominated for a Grammy Award in the Best Metal Performance category, making it the band's first Grammy nomination.

Background
"The Wake" was the first song to be released from the album, debuting on April 13, 2015. A lyric video was uploaded via Fearless Records' YouTube channel, with a digital single being released that same day. Metalsucks reviewer Axl Rosenburg responded positively to the track and commended the band on "keeping shit heavy when so many of their peers have gone in the other direction."

The album title was taken from a lyric in "Majoring in the Minors". In an interview with Outburn, guitarist JB Brubaker stated that the song was about touring all over the world and experiencing new things, making them the band they are today.

Critical reception

Metacritic, with six ratings from selected critics, assigns a score of 81 out of 100, giving the album acclaim. Awarding the album four and a half stars from Alternative Press, Dan Slessor states, "the quintet further distinguish themselves from the metalcore pack in a manner that seems effortless." Amy Sciarretto, giving the album a nine out of ten for Outburn, writes, "August Burns Red won't have trouble finding fans—both old and new—with this latest rallying cry." Rating the album a seven out of ten at Metal Hammer, Thea de Gallier describes, "Don't be put off, though – this is, at its heart, an emotionally charged thrillride of a record." Jake Denning, awarding the album a 9.4 out of ten review by AbsolutePunk, says, "Known for their intensity and unwavering vehemence, Found In Far Away Places shows the band exploring brand new territories both instrumentally and lyrically." Giving the album a seven out of ten from Exclaim!, Bradley Zorgdrager, states, "This is the sound of a band breaking out, and they haven't sounded this fresh in over half-a-decade." Awarding the album four stars for AllMusic, James Christopher Monger writes, "That the band never lose themselves in the process of these myriad digressions is impressive to say the least, but what's most notable about Found in Far Away Places is how fluid the ride is." Kerrang!, rating the album three K's, says, "There's nothing ambitious or monumental here but a tight 50 minutes of call-to-arms rage."

Sean Huncherick, awarding the album four stars from HM Magazine, writes, "With this new album, ABR shows that the genre still has something new to offer if a band is willing to break a few boundaries. In pushing forward, August Burns Red’s musicianship leans closer to progressive metal than ever on Found in Far Away Places." Giving the album four stars at Jesus Freak Hideout, Wayne Reimer says, "Found In Far Away Places is certainly a superbly composed record, and many a fan of flawlessly manicured metalcore will no doubt love it." Michael Weaver, rating the album three and a half stars for Jesus Freak Hideout, states, "Found in Far Away Places, shows little to no growth for the band since 2011...The instrumentation on Found in Far Away Places is as good as expected, but the creativity and sound is a little lackluster."

The album was included at No. 49 on Rock Sounds top 50 releases of 2015 list.

Commercial performance
Found in Far Away Places opened at No. 9 on the US Billboard 200 chart in the issue of July 18, 2015, moving 29,000 units in its first week, became the band's second top 10 album, following Rescue & Restore (2013).

Track listing

Personnel
August Burns Red
 Jake Luhrs – lead vocals
 JB Brubaker – lead guitar
 Brent Rambler – rhythm guitar
 Dustin Davidson – bass guitar, backing vocals
 Matt Greiner – drums, piano

Additional musicians
 Jeremy McKinnon of A Day to Remember – guest vocals on track 5
 Paul Waggoner of Between the Buried and Me – additional guitars on track 7

Additional personnel
 Carson Slovak – producer
 Grant McFarland – producer

Charts

Weekly charts

Year-end charts

References
Citations

Sources

 

2015 albums
August Burns Red albums
Fearless Records albums